Thaimi O'Reilly (born 20 July 1976) is a former Cuban-born Italian long jumper and triple jumper. 

Three-time Italian champion, she won also a French championship in 2003 in triple jump.

Biography
Born in Cuba, she moved to Italy in 1999 and in 2001 she acquired citizenship by marriage.

Achievements

National titles
O'Reilly won three national championships at individual senior level.
Italian Athletics Championships
Long jump: 2003
Italian Indoor Athletics Championships
Long jump: 2003, 2004

See also
 Italian all-time lists - Triple jump
 Naturalized athletes of Italy

References

External links
 

1976 births
Living people
Italian female long jumpers
Italian female triple jumpers
Cuban emigrants to Italy
Naturalised citizens of Italy